Tinjan is a village and municipality in Istria, Croatia. The total population is 1,684 (2011 census), distributed in the following settlements:
 Brčići, population 100
 Brečevići, population 187
 Jakovici, population 268
 Kringa, population 315
 Muntrilj, population 77
 Radetići, population 210
 Tinjan, population 417
 Žužići, population 110

Tinjan is located is 50 km north of Pula and 10 km southwest of Pazin, in the Draga valley. The Coat of Arms of Tinjan is azure on a base vert a tower argent behind walls of the same. This is based on the historical pattern.

References

External links

 Official site
 Official tourist info
 Karate club Tinjan

Municipalities of Croatia
Populated places in Istria County